Polish heraldry is typical to the Polish nobility/szlachta, which has its origins in Middle Ages knights/warriors clans that provided military support to the King, Dukes or overlords.

Exceptions apart, all Polish families belonging to the same noble rod/clan used/use the same coat of arms. Polish original word Herb makes reference to the clan as well to the coat of arms at the same time.

Polish heraldry 

Traditionally Polish noble families/rody refer to people that share common roots, consanguinity, later, it also included further kinship.
Some think the Polish clan does not mean consanguinity nor territoriality, as do the Scottish clan, but only membership in the same knight/warrior group (or a brotherhood of Knights).  For that reason, there are hundreds of different families in the same clan and all of them were/are entitled to use the same coat of arms.  However, in regards to consanguinity, the matter is far from settled, and the question matters because of historiographical concern to discover the origins of the privileged status by membership in the knights' clan.  In the year 1244, Bolesław, Duke of Masovia, identified members of the knights' clan as members of a genealogia:

"I received my good servitors [Raciborz and Albert] from the land of [Great] Poland, and from the clan [genealogia] called Jelito, with my well-disposed knowledge [i.e., consent and encouragement] and the cry [vocitatio], [that is], the godło, [by the name of] Nagody, and I established them in the said land of mine, Masovia, [on the military tenure described elsewhere in the charter]."

The documentation regarding Raciborz and Albert's tenure is the earliest surviving of the use of the clan name and cry defining the honorable status of Polish knights.  The names of knightly genealogiae only came to be associated with heraldic devices later in the Middle Ages and in the early modern period.  The Polish clan name and cry ritualized the ius militare, i.e., the power to command an army; and they had been used some time before 1244 to define knightly status. Nevertheless, in daily life, (from the 17th to the 20th centuries), the sense of belonging to a family predominated.  This is indicated by the organization of most of Polish armorial, which are arranged by specific families and not by coat of arms.

It is known that a sense of belonging and attachment to the clan crest lineage existed in the old Polish consciousness and had survived from the Middle Ages, but it was probably more ceremonial and symbolic than "everyday".

Especially since there were fairly frequent instances, particularly among the poorer nobility in the 19th century, of accidentally (and sometimes deliberately) identifying themselves with various Coat of arms to the heraldry offices of the partitioning countries.  In this way, members of a single family sometimes formally became members of various Coats of arms. Also in those times, Magnate families and some middle landowners families obtained titles (Prince, Count, Baron) and their own coats of arms, (variations of their original Herb), from the partitioning monarchies, the French empire, the Pope and other kingdoms.

Polish Coat of arms have an own name, usually coming from its old War cry or the drawing.

List
The coats of arms are listed under their most popular name, which is followed by their alternate names in brackets.

A
Abdank (Awdaniec, Abdanek, Białkotka, Buczacki, Habdank, Łękawa, Skuba, Wiszowaty)
Abgarowicz
Achinger (Aichinger, Ajchigier)
Agryppa
Aksak
Alabanda (Alba-luna, Bielina, Koniowaszyja)
Alemani (Alameni, Allemani)
Allan
Amadej (Amadejowa, Hemadejowa, Orłek bez ogona)
Antoniewicz (Bołoz)
Awdaniec 
Azewoja
Azulewicz

Ancuta

B
Bajbuza
Batorsag (Own coat of arms, originating from Hungary) 
Bełty
Bes
Beztrwogi
Białynia (Bialina, Bielina)
Biberstein (Bibersztein, Bibersztajn, Bibersztyn, Bieberstein, Momot)
Bielawa 
Bielina
Bieńkowski (Korwin variation)
Biliński (Sas variation)Bielecki 
Bogdanowicz 
Bogoria or Bogorya
Bogusz

Bojcza (Boycza, Modzele, Piasnicza)
Bończa (Głoworożec, Jednorożec, Tomaszewski)
Boreyko 
Bożawola
Bożezdarz
Brama
Brochwicz (Jeleń, Opole)
Brodzic
Bronic (Jelec, Łopot)
Bronisław 
Brzuska

C
Casafranca (Kazafranka)
Celejów
Chlibkiewicz
Cholewa
Chłędowski
Chomąto (Pantera)
Choryński (Chory, Chorynski, Chorinský,  Chorinsky, Chorinská)
Chyliński
Cielątkowa (Kucza)
Cieleski
Ciężosił
Ciołek (Biała)
Czarlinski coat of arms (Sowa)
Czartoryski
Czarnowron (Ślepowron variation Czarnowron) 
Czewoja (Czawa, Łzawia, Łzawa)

D
Dąb (Dub, Ehler, Żelechy)
Dąbrowa
Dąbrowski (Panna)
Dąbrowski I
Dębno (Sędowojna)
Denhof (Denhoff)
Deszpot

Dobrostanski 
Doliwa(Krzucki  Kruski)
Dołęga 
Domeyko coat of arms

Drogomir 
Drogosław 
Druck (Drucki Książę)
Dryja (Drya, Mutina)
Drzewica
Działosza

E
Eberc 
Erbs

F
Fąferek
Felsztyński 
Fiedler
Fornalski 
Frycz

G
Garczyński (Sas variation)
Gąska (Budzisz, Paparona)
Giejsz
Geysztor
Gierałt (Ciecierza, Cietrzew, Osmoróg, Rogów)
Ginwiłł (Ginwił)
Glaubicz (Carpio, Glajbicz, Glaubitz, Glubos, Gluboz, Gloubus, Glawbz, Karp)
Gliński
Gniazdowski
Godziemba (Godzięba, Godzięby)
Goły (Goły, Goły)
Gondek (Gądek, Gondekowa) 
Gozdawa (Gozdowa, Gzdow, Gozdzie, Smora)
Górski (Doliwa, Motyl, Rave)
Grabie (Chlewiotki, Grabia, Graby, Kocina, Leśniowie)
Grabowiec
Groty
Gruszowski
Gryf (Swoboda, Świeboda)
Grzebyk
Gryzima (Gryżyna, Lupus)
Grzymała
Gutak
Gutowski
Gwiazdy
Gwiaździcz

H
Haller (Haller de Hallenburg)
Hełm
Herburt (Herbott, Fulsztyn, Herbolt, Herbort, Herbortowa)
Hipocentaur (Hipocentaurus, Kitaurus)
Hodyc (Rogala variation)
Hołobok (Gołobok, Ołobok)
Hołownia
Hornowski
Hozyusz
Hubal

I
Iwanowski (Rogala variation)

J
Jabłonowski
Jakimowicz
Janina (Pole w polu)
Januszkiewicz 
Jasieńczyk (Jasieniec, Jasiona, Klucz)
Jastrzębiec (Bolesta, Boleścic, Dymowski, Kamiona, Ludbrza, Łazęki, Nagóra, Zarasy, Mystkowski)
Jaślin
Jaworski (Dubik) coat of arms (Koźlarogi, Koźlerogi, Nagody)
Jednorożec
Jelita
Jezierza (Jeziora)
Jeż
Junosza (Baran, Junoszyc)

Juńczyk

K
Kacmajor
Kalinowa
Kamecki (Ślepowron variation Kamecki)
Caminschi
Karnas (Karnakoewski, Karnish, Rákóczi)
Kemlada (Kiemlada, Kimlada, Grabowski)
Kierdeja (Kierdejowa), (Kiedrowski), (Kiedrowicz)
Kietlicz (Kiczka, Kyczka, Kitschka)
Klamry
Kolakowski
Komar
Konderski (Konderski, Konder, Kondek)
Kopacz (Skrzydło, Topacz)
Kopaszyna (Czeluść, Kopasina, Poruba, Zawotuł)
Korab (Korabczyk, Korabczyce, Korabiów)
Korczak (Wręby)
Kornic (Błogosław hospody, Kornicz, Kurnicz)
Korsak
Korwin (Corvus, Corvinus, Corvin, Kruk, Bujno, Ślepowron odmiana (variation) Korwin)
Korybut
Korzbok (Korbog, Korcbok, Kurczbach)
Kos (Koss)
Kościesza (Kościerza, Strzegomia, Strzegonia)
Kot Morski
Kotwica (Strumberg)
Kotwicz (Ćwieki, Kotłicz, Kottwitz, Kotwic)
Kownia (Koprynia, Kowinia, Równia, Skowina)
Kozicki
Kozłowski
Krukowski
Krutta
Kruzer
Krybelli
Krydener
Kryg
Krygel
Kryger
Krygshaber
Krygsztejn
Krynicki (own COA of the Kobyzewicz-Krynicki noble family; granted in 1589).
Kryszpin
Krzywda
Księżyc
Kuksz
Kulakowski
Kur (Kur Biały)
Kur II (Kur Czarny)
Kurowski
Kusza
Kuszaba (Bychawa, Kuczaba, Parzyca, Rakwicz)

L
Lachnicki
Larysza (Borysowie, Gleżyn, Laryssa)
Leliwa
Leszczyc (Bróg, Brożek, Brożyna, Laska, Laski, Wyszowie)

Leszewski / Liszewski Coat of Arms, Knights, Nobles
Lewalt
Lewart (Walny, Wali-uszy)
((Liczbinskich 
Limanowski (Limanowa, Lwow)
Lis (Lisowie, Mzura, Strempacz, Orzi-Orzi)
Lubicz (luba)
Lubomirski

Ł
Łabędziogrot
Łabędzik
Łabędź (Skrzynno, Skrzyńscy, Kudrick, Kudrewicz, Kudrycki, Kudrzycki) 
Łada (Ładzice, Łady, Mancz)
Łagoda (Bienia, Połańcze, Wierzynkowa)
Łodzia (Framberg, Fragenbarg, Frymbark, Smigielski, Szmigielski)
Łuk

M
Mądrostki (Śmiara, Zmiara)
Materna (Ślepowron variation Materna, also Korwin variation)
Masalski Książe III
Mniszech
Mogiła
Mohyła 
Mora (Mory, Morawa, Murzynowa Głowa)
Murdelio
Milczek

N
Nabram (Kłobuk, Nabra, Stańczowie, Waldorf)
Nałęcz (Pomłość, Nałęcz - Jezioro)
Napiwon (Awsłcy, Napiwie, Napiwoń, Napiwowie)
Nieczaj (herb własny, odmiana Pobóg)
Nieczuja (Cielech, Cielechy, Ostref, Ostrzew, Pień, Necznia)
Niesobia (Krzywosąd, Słodziej, Złodzieje)
Nowina (Złotogoleńczyk, Zawiasa)
Nurseski coat of arms
Nycz

O
Odrowąż
Odwaga (Mur Konopackich)
Odyniec
Ogończyk (Drogosław, Ogony, Powała, Sudkowicz)
Oksza (Bradacica, Hoksza, Kołda)
Oława (Oliwa)
Orda
Orla (Mściug, Opala, Opola, Saszor also Szaszor, Zapale)
Osek
Oskierka (lub Oskierko, herb własny, odmiana Murdelio)
Ossorya (Ossolińczyk, Poświst, Szarza)
Ostoja (Mościc)
Ostroga
Ostrogski
Oszyk
Owada (Ulina)

P
Paprzyca
Pelikan
Piast Eagle (Orzeł Piastowski)
Pierzchała (Kolumna, Colonna, Roch, Trzaska, Wiszowaty)
Pilawa (Pilawa, Zet)
Piłsudski
Pniejnia (Cwalina, Karwowski)
Pobóg (Pobodze, Pobożany)
Pogonia (Borzezdarz, Zdarzbog)
Pogoń Litewska
Pogoń Ruska
Pokorski
Pomerzanin
Pomian (Proporczyk)
Poraj (Róża)
Poronia
Półkozic (Połukoza, Ośla Głowa)
Pół Orła (Orlica, Paczko)
Późniak
Prawdzic (Prawda)
Prus (MRUK, Słubica, Turzyna, Wagi, Wiskałła, Moszczenica, Ważanki, Wilcze Kosy, Napole, Nagody, Napora)
Prus II Wilczekosy (Wilcze Kosy, Stubica, Falcastrum Lupinum)
Prus III
Przegonia
Przeginia (Przegonia)
Przerowa (Grotowie, Proporzec, Przyrowa)
Przosna (Prozna)
Przyjaciel
Przykorwin (Korwin variation Przykorwin)
Puchała (Sławęcin, Biała)

R
Radwan (Wierzbowa, Kaja)
Rawa (Rawicz, Niedźwiada)
Rawski
Rhau von Gutowski (Rhau)
Roch III (Pierzchała, Skała Łamana)
Rogala (Czabory, Celbarz)
Rola (Kroje)
Rosyniec (Ślepowron variation Rosyniec)
Rozmiar
Ryc
Rupniowski Szreniawa
Rymer (Reymner, Rejmer)

Sandrecki (Ślepowron variation Sandrecki)
Sas (Drag)
Sas II

Saszor (also Szaszor, alias Orla arms)
Skarupski
Skarzyna
Sokola
Sołtyk
Smigelski 
Starykoń (Zaprzaniec)
Starnberg (Sztembark)
Starża Szołayski (Princely House of Starza Szolayski, Szołayski, Sołajski, Szołayscy, Szolayskich)
Strzemię (Larysza, Ławszowa, Strepa, Zarosie)
Suchekomnaty (Kownaty, Suchekownaty)
Sulima
Syrokomla
Szeliga
Szembek
Szreniawa
Skupniewski
Szymajnskí

Ś
Ślepowron (Bujno, Pęszno, Korwin, Corvin, Ślepy Wron)
Śreniawa (Krzywaśń, Occele)
Świat
Świeńczyc
Świerczek
Świnka (Męda)
Szaława (Salava)
Śzymanskí coat of arms

T
Tabaczynski
Taczała (Żóraw)
Tarnawa
Terletsky
Topór (Bipenn, Kołki, Starża, Wścieklica)
Trąby (Brzezina)
Trubecki (Trubeck)
Trzaska (Biała, Lubiewo)
Trestka
Trzywdar
Trzy Gwiazdy
Trzy Kawki (Borch)
Tracewski

U
Urbanski

W
Wadwicz
Waga
Walkiewicz
Warnia (Borewa, Rak)
Wąż (Wężyk, Zachórz, Zatorz)
Wczele (Łębno, Pczelicz, Szachownica)
Wejher (Skarzyna, Skarżyna, Pomerzanin, Weicher, Weiher)
Wieniawa(Żubrza Głowa, Pierścina)
Wielorad
Wieruszowa
Wierzbna
Wilcza Głowa (Klejna)
Wnorowski (Kościesza)
Wukry
Wysocki
Wyssogota (Wyssogata, Wyskota, Wyszkota)

Z
Zabawa
Zadora (Budziszyn, Płomień)
Zagłoba
Zaremba (Zaręba)
Zawadzki
Zerwikaptur(Koziegłowy)
Zgraja (Kunraczyc, Janina)

Images of some Polish-Lithuanian Clans coat of arms

Images of some personal coat of arms

See also

 Polish heraldry
 Polish name
 Polish clans
 szlachta
 History of Poland

References

Bibliography
 Tadeusz Gajl, "Herby szlacheckie Rzeczypospolitej Obojga Narodow", Gdansk, 2003, 
 Polish Coats of Arms listing (Polish)
 Armorial

External links
Polish coats of arms - a full list of Polish coats of arms
Herbarz szlachty Rzeczypospolitej - Polish noble families, coats of arms and pictures
Herbarz - list of Polish coats of arms, black and white reproductions

 
Nobility coats of arms
Nobility